NGC 910 is an elliptical galaxy in the constellation of Andromeda. NGC 910 was discovered on October 17, 1786 by the German-British astronomer William Herschel. It is the brightest galaxy in the cluster Abell 347.

See also 
 List of NGC objects (1–1000)

References

External links
 

Elliptical galaxies
0910
Andromeda (constellation)
009201